DWSG (91.9 FM), broadcasting as 91.9 Radyo Natin, is a radio station owned and operated by Manila Broadcasting Company. Its studios and transmitter are located (down the RRH Trading) at 2nd Floor, Roda Bldg., Maharlika Hwy., Pangpang, Sorsogon City.

References

Radio stations in Sorsogon